Spendthrift Farm is a thoroughbred race horse breeding farm and burial site in Lexington, Kentucky, currently owned by Eric & Tammy Gustavson. It was founded by Leslie Combs II and named for the great stallion Spendthrift, who was owned by Combs' ancestor, Daniel Swigert of Elmendorf Farm.  Spendthrift was the great-grandfather of Man o' War.

Although Spendthrift Farm is known mostly as a commercial breeding operation, they maintain a small racing stable as well. Their most notable runners are Beholder, a 4-time Eclipse Award winning mare, Lord Nelson, a three-time Gr.I winning sprinter, and Court Vision, who won the Breeders' Cup Mile and now stands at Spendthrift.

History

In 1966 Majestic Prince was foaled at Spendthrift, bred by Combs. The famous son of Raise A Native later was returned to the farms and died there in 1981. In 1979, the great Triple Crown winner Seattle Slew was retired to stud and stood at Spendthrift until 1987.

Spendthrift Farms went public in 1983. In 1984 Queen Elizabeth II visited Spendthrift Farms to view not only Seattle Slew but also Affirmed as possible studs for her stable of Thoroughbreds containing 22 broodmares.

In 1984 the Keeneland Association honored Spendthrift Farm with its Mark of Distinction for their contribution to Keeneland and the Thoroughbred industry.

In 1988, Spendthrift Farms filed for bankruptcy. The farm was acquired out of bankruptcy the next year by Terry McBrayer, Curtis C. Green, Henry "Cap" Hershey, and William du Pont III

Spendthrift Farms was sold in a foreclosure auction to MetLife in 1993. MetLife resold it to lawyer Ted Taylor the next year. In 2000, the farm was acquired by Bruce Klein. In 2004, B. Wayne Hughes, the founder of Public Storage, purchased the historic farm.

In 2020, as part of an ownership group with MyRaceHorse Stable, Madaket Stables, and Starlight Racing, Spendthrift was named the leading owner for North American earnings due to a successful season for Authentic.

Burial site
Along with being a breeding facility in the 1960s and 70's, several important racehorses are buried at the farm.  These include, Nashua, Never Bend, Prince John, Raise A Native, Gallant Man, Caro, and Valdez. Landaluce was moved to the farm from the Hollywood Park Racetrack in 2014 after the racetrack closed.

Stallion roster

Their 2022 stallion roster and their stud fees are:

 Authentic  — $70,000
 Basin — $7,500
 By My Standards — $7,500
 Bolt d'Oro — $20,000
 Brody's Cause — $5,000
 Cloud Computing — $5,000
 Coal Front — $5,000
 Cross Traffic — $7,500
 Free Drop Billy — $5,000
 Goldencents — $15,000
 Gormley — $7,500
 Hit It a Bomb — $5,000
 Into Mischief — $250,000
 Jimmy Creed — $10,000
 Known Agenda — $10,000
 Maximus Mischief — $7,500
 Mitole — $15,000
 Mor Spirit — $5,000
 Omaha Beach — $30,000
 Rock Your World — $10,000
 Temple City — $5,000
 Thousand Words — $7.500
 Vekoma  — $17,500
 Vino Rosso — $20,000
 Yaupon — $30,000

Spendthrift Farm also owns shares in regional stallions, including Flashpoint, who stands in Louisiana, Normandy Invasion, who stands in New York, Freedom Child and Super Ninety Nine, who both stand in Maryland.

Plaut v. Spendthrift Farm

The 1995 United States Supreme Court case Plaut v. Spendthrift Farm, Inc. arose from a securities fraud lawsuit against the farm relating to its 1983 public offering of stock.

References
Notes

Further reading

External links
 Spendthrift Farm

American racehorse owners and breeders
Horse farms in Kentucky
Equine firms based in Kentucky
Companies that filed for Chapter 11 bankruptcy in 1988
Companies based in Lexington, Kentucky